Omruduiyeh (also Romanized as Omrūdūīyeh and Omrūdūeeyeh) is a village in Bezenjan Rural District, in the Central District of Baft County, Kerman Province, Iran. At the time of the 2006 census, its population was 98, in 21 families.

References 

Populated places in Baft County